Kiss Five (stylized in lower case, commonly referred to as K.I.S.S. 5 or Kiss 5) is the fourth album by American rapper K Camp. It was released on April 24, 2020 via Rare Sound/Interscope Records, serving as the sequel to his 2017 Kiss 4 mixtape and the fifth volume in his KISS series. Production was handled by several record producers, including Natra Average, Jarrod Doyle, and K Camp's frequent collaborators Bobby Kritical and Musik MajorX. It features guest appearances from Ari Lennox, 6lack, Fabo, Jacquees, Jeremih, Joe Trufant, Tink, Wale, Yella Beezy and Yung Bleu.

The album peaked at number 29 on the US Billboard 200, making it the rapper's second most successful project after 2015 release of Only Way Is Up. It was promoted with two singles: "Lottery (Renegade)" with music video directed by Matthew Daniel Siskin, and "Ice Cold" with music video directed by Grant Spanier, and music videos for "Rude Boy" and "Friendly" both directed by Creed x Nfluence.

Track listing

Personnel

Kristopher "K Camp" Campbell – main artist, producer (track 7), recording (tracks: 1–5, 7–9, 11, 14)
Lefabian "Fabo" Williams – featured artist (track 3)
Rodriquez Jacquees Broadnax – featured artist (track 4)
Olubowale "Wale" Akintimehin – featured artist (track 5)
Joe Trufant – featured artist (track 5)
Jeremy "Yung Bleu" Biddle – featured artist (track 8)
Courtney "Ari Lennox" Salter – featured artist (track 10)
Ricardo "6lack" Valentine, Jr. – featured artist (track 10)
Trinity "Tink" Home – featured artist (track 10)
Deandre "Yella Beezy" Conway – featured artist (track 11)
Jeremy "Jeremih" Felton – featured artist (track 13)
Jarrod "J-Rod" Doyle – producer (tracks: 1, 2, 9), mixing, recording (tracks: 1-11, 14, 15)
Christopher "Natra Average" Gibbs – producer (tracks: 3, 5, 8, 10)
Taylor Banks – producer (track 3)
Joel Banks – producer (track 3)
Sean Mula – producer (track 3)
Kevlin "Nash B" Brown – producer (track 4)
Sean Momberger – producer (track 4)
Jason "Jsn" Vaughn – producer (track 5)
Teddy "RetroFuture" Pena – producer (tracks: 6, 12, 13)
Trevon "XL Eagle" Campbell – producer (track 7)
Jerod "Swayvvo" Morton – producer (track 8)
Bobby Turner – producer (tracks: 10, 11)
Marcus "Motif Alumni" Rucker – producer (track 11)
Quinton L. Cook – producer (track 14)
Timothy M. Wells – producer (track 14)
Bryan "Reazy Renegade" Johnson – producer (track 15)
Glenn Schick – mastering (tracks: 1–4, 6, 10, 15)

Charts

References

K Camp albums
Sequel albums
2020 mixtape albums